Hugh is an artificial intelligence robot librarian designed by William Sachiti and Ariel Ladegaard  at Aberystwyth University.  Funded by Academy of Robotics in the UK, the robot was first publicized in February 2016. Hugh was to stand at 1.4 metres tall and weigh 60 pounds, and its core function would be to help users in locating and navigating them to desired books in the library.

Hugh never left the prototyping stage and is currently not in use in any Aberystwyth University library.

Technology 
Hugh runs the linux based Robot Operating System (ROS) with a combination of modules built on top combining voice search through Google APIs, and navigation. The robot uses a mini lidar for location and prebuilt maps of library layouts. API from Ex Libris Group gives the robot a catalogue of up to several million books which it can locate and navigate a user to.  The screen doubling up as a touch-screen, allows Hugh to express himself through several facial expressions and display results.

References

External links 
 

Service robots